Zante is an alternative name of the Greek island of Zakynthos.

Zante may also refer to
in Latvia
Zante Manor, a manor house
Zante parish
in the United States
Zante, California
Zante Plantation, a plantation in South Carolina
Other
Zante currant
Zante, a concept car built by TVR in 1972